Ephraim is a city in Sanpete County, Utah, United States. The population was 5,611 at the 2020 census, making it the largest city in Sanpete County. It is the location of Snow College and is located along U.S. Route 89.

History
The first settlement at Ephraim was made in 1854. A post office called Ephraim has been in operation since 1856. The town was named after Ephraim of the Old Testament.

Geography
Ephraim is located in the Sanpete Valley, on the east side of the San Pitch River.

According to the United States Census Bureau, the city has a total area of 3.6 square miles (9.2 km2), all land.

Demographics

As of the census of 2000, there were 4,505 people, 1,128 households, and 753 families residing in the city. The population density was 1,262.4 people per square mile (487.2/km2). There were 1,275 housing units at an average density of 357.3 per square mile (137.9/km2). The racial makeup of the city was 89.23% White, 0.38% African American, 0.38% Native American, 1.29% Asian, 0.53% Pacific Islander, 6.86% from other races, and 1.33% from two or more races. Hispanic or Latino of any race were 9.86% of the population.

There were 1,128 households, out of which 38.7% had children under 18 living with them, 55.8% were married couples living together, 7.4% had a female householder with no husband present, and 33.2% were non-families. 14.6% of all households were made up of individuals, and 7.6% had someone living alone who was 65 years or older. The average household size was 3.59, and the average family size was 3.71.

In the city, the population was spread out, with 24.9% under 18, 42.4% from 18 to 24, 14.0% from 25 to 44, 12.3% from 45 to 64, and 6.5% who were 65 years of age or older. The median age was 20 years. For every 100 females, there were 80.9 males. For every 100 females aged 18 and over, there were 73.3 males.

The median income for a household in the city was $28,318, and the median income for a family was $35,568. Males had a median income of $28,421 versus $21,042 for females. The per capita income for the city was $9,624. About 12.3% of families and 31.0% of the population were below the poverty line, including 13.0% of those under age 18 and 7.8% of those aged 65 or over.

Education
Ephraim is located in the South Sanpete School District and has Ephraim Elementary School and Ephraim Middle School. High school students attend Manti High School in nearby Manti. It is also the location of Snow College, which was founded in 1888 as the LDS Sanpete Stake Academy. It was later renamed Snow Academy in honor of Erastus Snow and his distant cousin, LDS president, Lorenzo Snow, and finally, to Snow College in 1923. Ownership of the college was transferred to Utah in 1932. Current enrollment is around 5,900, some of whom attend the Richfield campus.
Utah State University operates a branch campus in Ephraim that offers Bachelors's and Graduate Degrees.

Climate 
According to the Köppen Climate Classification system, Ephraim has a semi-arid climate, abbreviated "BSk" on climate maps. The data below are from the Western Regional Climate Center over the years 1949 to 2016.

Notable people
 Jon Cox, political advisor and former member of the Utah House of Representatives
 Linnie Findlay, historian
 Kay Mortensen, retired American professor
 Richard Nibley, violinist, composer, and educator

See also

 List of cities and towns in Utah
 Manti, Utah

References

External links

 Official website

Cities in Utah
Cities in Sanpete County, Utah
Populated places established in 1854
1854 establishments in Utah Territory